Fanta Zara Kamaté (25 October 1995) is an Ivorian women's football forward. She  played in the Turkish Women's First League for Fatih Vatan Spor  with jersey number 25.

Playing career

Club

Kamate moved to Turkey and joined 1207 Antalya Döşemealtı Belediyespor in the second half of the 2017-18 Turkish Women's First Football League. She capped in eight matches and scored one goal.

After her team was relegated to the Women's Second Football League, she transferred to the Istanbul-based club Fatih Vatan Spor.

Career statistics

References

External links
Fanta Zara Kamaté at Global Sport Archive

Living people
1995 births
Ivorian women's footballers
Women's association football forwards
Expatriate women's footballers in Turkey
Ivorian expatriate sportspeople in Turkey
1207 Antalya Spor players
Fatih Vatan Spor players